Bloomsbury EMB (Estate Management Board) is a tenant management organisation in England, running 659 social housing properties on behalf of Birmingham City Council.

Background
Bloomsbury EMB was one of the first estate management boards set up in England, established in 1989. When the UK Government introduced the 'Right to Manage' regulations in 1994, the EMB wanted to use these to take formal responsibility for running the estate, but it took until 2000 to take on these powers through the negotiation of a formal management agreement.

References

Tenant management organisations in England
Birmingham City Council